RC Olymp is a Ukrainian rugby club in Kharkiv. The team currently plays in the Ukraine Rugby Superliga. For the past few years the club has produced the majority of the Ukraine national team.

History
The club was founded in 1989.

Players

Current squad on 29 may 2020

Out for 2014-2015
  Sahak Oganezov (to Blue Bulls)

Staff
 Head Coach:  Valery Kochanov
 Assistant Coach:  Sergey Nedbaylo
 Assistant Coach:  Vladimir Tsapenko
 Team Doctor:  Sergey Podporynov

External links
 RC Olymp

Rugby clubs established in 1989
Ukrainian rugby union teams
Sport in Kharkiv